Daggers (stylized as the double dagger symbol ‡) is the debut studio album by collaborative project All Hail the Silence, consisting of musician BT and singer Christian Burns. The album was released on January 18, 2019.

BT and Christian are frequent collaborators, having worked together on songs from These Hopeful Machines, A Song Across Wires, and Simple Modern Answers. Daggers is the pair's first album release as a band, following the release the AHTS-001 extended play.

On September 28, 2018, the band released their first official single, "Diamonds in the Snow", along with its accompanying music video.

Track listing

References

External links 

2019 debut albums
All Hail the Silence albums
BT (musician) albums
Black Hole Recordings albums